Gregory Koger (born  1970s) is a political scientist in the United States, specializing in the study of filibustering and obstructionism in American legislative bodies.

Biography

Koger was a legislative assistant to Congressman George R. Nethercutt. In that position, he served as a political advisor on a variety of issues, assisted in drafting legislation, and as a liaison to the Appropriations Subcommittee on Defense.

He received his Ph.D. from UCLA in 2002.  He is the author of Filibustering: A Political History of Obstruction in the House and Senate, and is currently an assistant professor at the University of Miami.

Works

See also
 Filibuster
 Steven S. Smith

References

External links
 
 

American political scientists
University of California, Los Angeles alumni
1970s births
Living people